Tamworth services is a motorway service station on the M42 motorway near Tamworth Staffordshire, England. The border between Staffordshire and Warwickshire runs through the middle of Tamworth Services. Tamworth Services opened in 1990. It is owned by Moto. The service station is situated off junction 10, and is thus accessible to non-motorway traffic via the A5. 

Known brands include Greggs, a Marks and Spencer 'Simply Food' store, Burger King, Costa Coffee and WHSmith. There is also a Travelodge motel and a Ladbrokes bookmakers on site, not operated by Moto.

References

External links 
Motorway Services | Moto — Tamworth
Tamworth Services — Motorway Services Online

1990 establishments in England
Moto motorway service stations
M42 motorway service stations
Buildings and structures in Staffordshire
Buildings and structures in Warwickshire
Transport in Staffordshire
Transport in Warwickshire
Commercial buildings completed in 1990